2018 Empress's Cup Final was the 40th final of the Empress's Cup competition. The final was played at Panasonic Stadium Suita in Osaka on January 1, 2019. Nippon TV Beleza won the championship.

Overview
Nippon TV Beleza won their 13th title, by defeating INAC Kobe Leonessa 4–2 with Riko Ueki, Yuka Momiki and Mina Tanaka goals.

Match details

See also
2018 Empress's Cup

References

Empress's Cup
2018 in Japanese women's football